Malaysian Telugus, consists of people of full or partial Telugu descent who were born in or immigrated to Malaysia. Most Malaysian Telugus are descended from migrants during the colonial period. While the ancestors of most Malaysian Telugus originate from what is now Andhra Pradesh and Telangana, substantial numbers originated from the states of Orissa and Bengal. While most Telugus came to Malaysia as labourers, some were professionals and traders who arrived as refugees. In the 1930s, anti-Indian riots in Burma resulted in large numbers of ethnic Telugus fleeing from Burma either back to India, or to Malaya. Another wave of Telugu migration from Burma occurred during World War II, when the Japanese invaded Burma.

History 
Telugus along with other Indians from the India's east coast and the Bay of Bengal arrived on the shores of ancient Suvarnabhumi (referring to Malay Peninsula and Lower Burma, meaning "Land of Gold" in Sanskrit) and other parts of Southeast Asia. Indians from the Godavari basin arrived in the ancient Malay peninsula, trading and settling down, thus influencing local customs and culture. Sejarah Melayu addressed India as Benua Keling and Indians as "Keling", a word taken from Kalinga, an ancient Indian kingdom which is likely the source of Indian influence across Southeast Asia. Kalinga is located in the northern part of Andhra Pradesh covering the Godavari basin and the southern part of Orissa with people in this region now speaking either Telugu or Oriya.

The current population of Malaysian Telugus are mostly third and fourth generation Telugus who descended from indentured laborers under the Kangani system who arrived in the 19th and early 20th century. Some also paid their own passage after the Kangani system ended in the early 20th century. Most of the Telugu migrants to the Malay peninsula during the colonial era were from northern coastal regions of Andhra Pradesh, often recruited by maistries or kanganis (foremen) from the Visakhapatnam, Vizianagaram and Srikakulam regions, with some from the East Godavari and Chittoor regions. The migrants usually shared the same neighbourhood background, blood ties or caste connections. Telugus who arrived during the British colonial era were mainly non-Brahmin middle-ranking caste and lower caste Hindus from the Kamma, Reddy, Gavara, Kapu (Telaga), Velama, Chakali, and Mangali castes. Another recruitment centre was Nagapattinam in Tamil Nadu. While the Indian immigrants in the early period were predominantly men, the Telugus were more willing to bring women with them. Many Telugus arrived via Penang, settling in Bagan Datoh, Perak before scattering across the Malay peninsula, commonly found in the rubber and coconut plantations in Perak (such as Telok Anson), Johor, and Kedah. Bagan Datoh remains an important historical centre for Malaysian Telugus, with many Telugu cultural activities being conducted at Sri Venkateswara Temple. Other areas with notable Telugu populations include Lumut, Perak and Rawang, Selangor.

As the Telugus formed only a minority of Indians in British Malaya, with Tamils the most populous group, they weren't particularly visible as a group and thus their identity was subsumed into the larger group of South Indians. They, along with the Tamils and Malayalees, were referred to as Klings or Madrasis used as general terms for South Indians. In 1955, the Malaya Andhra Sanghamu, later Malaysia Andhra Sanghamu, was formed to support the Telugu community, foster their culture and promote their language.

Population 
Exact numbers of the Malaysian Telugu population are not known, however Telugus are thought to be the second largest group of Indians in Malaysia after Tamils. In British Malaya they formed around 4% of the Indian population. The Malaysian Telugu population was estimated in 2020 to be between 119,000 to 300,000, while the Telugu Association of Malaysia estimates the population to be around 500,000.

Language 
Malaysian Telugus speak the Telugu language, the world's most spoken Dravidian language which falls under the "South Central Dravidian" branch of the language family. In 1981, the Second World Telugu Conference was held in Kuala Lumpur. The Telugu Association of Malaysia (TAM;), a non profit NGO, serves to represent the interests of Malaysian Telugus as well as preserving and promoting Telugu language and culture. The Telugu Association of Malaysia was first formed in the Lower Perak District on 17 July 1955, under the banner of "Malaya Andhra Sangamu" and was officially registered on 17 February 1956. On 16 December 1963, it was renamed "Malaysia Andhra Sangamu". The name evolved into its current form in 1983 and is also known as "Malaysia Telugu Sangamu".

Prior to the late 1980s, there were as many as 63 Telugu medium schools, the last of these closing in 1990, with Telugu having ceased to be school exam subject in 1983. Large numbers of Telugus, along with other Indian minority groups, began to adopt the Tamil language and assimilate into the culture of the Tamils, who are the largest Indian ethno-linguistic group in Malaysia. There was a resurgence in Telugu language education following political and financial support from the Malaysian government beginning in 2010. In 2022 the Malaysian Indian Congress launched a Telugu branch to support the community's interests. Today there are more than 5000 new students who have been educated in the Telugu language at the Telugu Academy which was set up by the Telugu Association of Malaysia.

References

Further reading

External links
 Telugu Association of Malaysia website
 Telugu in Malaysia: Joshua Project
 వాడుకరి:మలేషియా తెలుగు

Telugu diaspora
Ethnic groups in Malaysia
Immigration to Malaysia